Barry Evan Axelrod (born August 21, 1946) is an American sports agent and lawyer who specializes in sports, entertainment and business law.

Education 
He graduated from the University of California, Los Angeles with a Bachelor of Arts in History in 1968 and from UCLA School of Law with a Juris Doctor in 1971.

Legal career

Pre-legal career 
While attending UCLA, he spent more than five years working part-time for a sports team physician, making friendships with many sports athletes who moved on to professional careers.

Legal career 
After three years in the general practice of law in a small firm, he joined the firm of Steinberg & Demoff as a partner and helped create the firm's Sports and Entertainment practice. Within two years, the firm represented approximately 100 athletes in the NFL, NBA, MLB, women's tennis, women's golf, auto racing and rodeo.

He left the firm in 1978 and became a sole practitioner with a focus on Sports and Entertainment Law.

He has operated his own law firm in Encinitas, California since 1979.

He is a member of the Sports Lawyers Association and taught Sports Law at Pepperdine University Law School in 1994 to 1995.

Notable clients 
He has a large client list that includes: Jake Peavy, Jeff Bagwell, Craig Biggio, Matt Morris, Matt Clement, Phil Nevin, as well as Arizona Diamondbacks General Manager Kevin Towers, broadcasters Rick Sutcliffe, Mark Grace and Wally Joyner, actors Mark Harmon and Pam Dawber, and lastly professional figure skater Michelle Kwan.

Other activities 
He served on the board of directors of the United States Anti-Doping Agency from 2000 to 2011.

References

External links 
Archived Board of Directors Bio

Living people
1946 births
UCLA School of Law alumni
University of California, Los Angeles alumni
American sports agents
American lawyers